Mesnilana is a genus of parasitic flies in the family Tachinidae. There is one described species in Mesnilana, M. bevisi.

Distribution
South Africa

References

Dexiinae
Tachinidae genera
Diptera of Africa
Monotypic Brachycera genera